Bayrak is a Turkish word meaning "flag", and it may refer to:

Bayrak (surname)
 Bayrak, the official radio and television broadcasting corporation of the self-proclaimed 'Turkish Republic of Northern Cyprus'
 Bajrak, former political entity in the Gheg-inhabited northern Albanian territories 
 Al Bayrak, Lebanese daily newspaper from 1911 until 2011
 Bayrak, Çermik

See also 
 Bajraku (peak)
 Bayrock (disambiguation)